William Frederick Roome (November 21, 1841 – September 1, 1921) was a physician and political figure in Ontario, Canada. He represented Middlesex West in the House of Commons of Canada from 1887 to 1896 as a Conservative member.

He was born in Oxford Township, Canada West. Roome received an M.D. from the University of Michigan. In 1869, he married Maggie Anderson. He served as a member of the council for Newbury and as chairman of the school board. Roome was defeated by Donald Mackenzie Cameron in an 1883 by-election. He defeated Cameron in the 1887 federal election; that election was appealed but he won the by-election which followed in 1888. He served until 1896, when he was defeated by William Samuel Calvert.

References 

 
The Canadian parliamentary companion, 1891 JA Gemmill

External links
 

1841 births
1921 deaths
Members of the House of Commons of Canada from Ontario
Conservative Party of Canada (1867–1942) MPs
University of Michigan Medical School alumni